Vasileios Zikos Chua Ming Xun (born 15 April 2002) is a Singaporean professional footballer who plays as a forward for Singapore Premier League club Young Lions, on loan from Geylang International.

Early life 
Zikos Chua was born in Greece to a Greek mother and a Chinese Singaporean father and grew up in Kastoria, Macedonia, Greece, with his younger brother, before returning to Singapore when he was 10. He was a student at Tanjong Katong Secondary School when he made his first bow as a professional footballer.

Club career

Youth
Zikos Chua started his career with the National Football Academy before he was signed by former Geylang Head Coach Noor Ali for the club's Under-19 side in 2017. He has also represented Singapore at various levels and was nominated for The New Paper Dollah Kassim Award in 2017.

While playing for the National Football Academy, Chua was also representing his school, Tanjong Katong Secondary School, in the National "C" Division, scoring 26 goals in 2016 to help his school win the title. He was named in Goal Singapore's 2020 NxGn list following his sublime performances for Geylang International.

Geylang International
On 4 July 2018, Chua came on as a late substitute in Geylang International FC's 3–1 win over Young Lions at Jalan Besar Stadium for his professional debut at the age of 16, Chua eclipsed the previous record set by Hariss Harun as the youngest ever debutant in the Singapore Premier League. He was the youngest player to ever play in the country's top tier of soccer and is the third-youngest scorer in the history of Singapore's professional league.

On 14 April 2019, Chua became the third youngest scorer in Singapore Premier League history, at 16 years and 364 days, after Hariss Harun and Fareez Farhan. He kept his exploits by becoming the youngest player ever to reach the five-goal mark in league history, at 17 years and 102 days on 27 July 2019.

As of April 2020, Chua has scored 5 goals in 13 matches for the Eagles.

He suffered an ACL injury in 2019 and

International career 
Zikos Chua was first called up to the Singapore under-22 in 2019 for the 2019 Merlion Cup. He made his debut for the team on 7 June 2019, in a 3–0 win against Philippines. He made his debut against Philippines in the Merlion Cup.

On 31 July 2019, Fadzuhasny Juraimi named Chua in the Singapore squad for 2019 AFF U18 Championship.

Career statistics

Club

International

U23 International caps

U19 International caps

U16 International caps

U16 International goals

Honours

International
Singapore U22
 Merlion Cup: 2019

References

2002 births
Living people
Footballers from Kastoria
Singaporean footballers
Singapore youth international footballers
Greek footballers
Singaporean sportspeople of Chinese descent
Singaporean people of Greek descent
Greek people of Singaporean descent
Association football midfielders
Singapore Premier League players
Geylang International FC players
Greek Macedonians
Competitors at the 2021 Southeast Asian Games
Southeast Asian Games competitors for Singapore